Adelospondylus is an extinct lepospondyl amphibian.

References

External links
2D, stereoscopic, and 3D imagery of the type specimen of Adelospondylus watsoni

Adelospondyls
Carboniferous amphibians of Europe
Taxa named by Robert L. Carroll
Fossil taxa described in 1967